Mikhouderovka is a rural locality (a selo) and the administrative center of Mikhouderovskoye Rural Settlement, Alexeyevsky District, Belgorod Oblast, Russia. The population was 1,326 as of 2010. There are 21 streets.

Geography 
Mikhouderovka is located 19 km northeast of Alexeyevka (the district's administrative centre) by road. Dalneye Chesnochnoye is the nearest rural locality.

References 

Rural localities in Alexeyevsky District, Belgorod Oblast
Biryuchensky Uyezd